Disciple of Death is a 1972 British horror film written and directed by Tom Parkinson. It stars Mike Raven, Ronald Lacey and Nicholas Amer.

Cast
 Mike Raven as Stranger
 Ronald Lacey as Parson
 Nicholas Amer as Melchisidech
 Stephen Bradley as Ralph
 Marguerite Hardiman as Julia
 Virginia Wetherell as Ruth 
 George Belbin as Squire
 Betty Alberge as Dorothy
 Rusty Goffe as Dwarf
 Louise Jameson as Betty
 Joe Dunlop as Mathew
 Daisika as Gypsy

Reception
The film had a generally poor reception, with critic Chris Wood stating: "Disciple of Death is the worst film I have ever seen. It is quite simply a stinker of remarkable ineptitude – featuring the worst performance by a leading man in the history of celluloid, some truly pitiful special effects, a story which beggars belief and camerawork and direction which… well, I despair." Other critics had the same reaction.

References

External links
 

1972 horror films